(Moritz Wilhelm) Hugo Ribbert (1 March 1855 in Hohenlimburg – 6 November 1920 in Bonn) was a German professor of pathology.

Ribbert studied at Bonn, Berlin and Strassburg. In 1883 he was appointed Professor extraordinarius at Bonn. In 1892 he became professor at Zurich. In 1900 he moved to Marburg University; in 1903 he moved to Göttingen University; and in 1905 he returned to Bonn.

An 1881 conference report of Ribbert is considered to be the first description of  cells infected with the cytomegalovirus. In 1905 Ribbert proposed an embryonal origin for cancer (Cohnheim-Ribbert theory of cancer).

Works
 Lehrbuch der pathologischen Histologie für Studirende und Aerzte , 1896
 Die Lehren vom Wesen der Krankheiten in ihrer geschichtlichen Entwicklung, 1899
 Lehrbuch der allgemeinen Pathologie und der pathologischen Anatomie, 1901
 Lehrbuch der speciellen Pathologie und der speciellen pathologischen Anatomie, 1902
 Geschwulstlehre für Aerzte und Studierende, 1904
 Das Wesen der Krankheit, 1909
 Das Karzinom des Menschen, sein Bau, sein Wachstum, seine Entstehung, 1911
 Die Bedeutung der Krankheiten für die Entwicklung der Menschheit, 1912

References

1855 births
1920 deaths
German pathologists
Academic staff of the University of Bonn